The Midland Railway 1833 Class was a class of thirty 0-4-4T steam locomotives.  They are sometimes included with the earlier 1823 Class or the later 2228 Class.

Construction
Originally built in two batches: numbers 1833–1842 and 2013–2022 were built in 1892 by Dübs and Company and 2218–2227 in 1893 by Neilson and Company.  The 2228 Class followed in 1895.  In the 1907 Midland Railway renumbering scheme these became numbers 1351–1380.  They retained their numbers through the LMS period.

BR Service
Fourteen survived to be inherited by BR in 1948; numbers 1353/57/58/60/65–68/70/71/73/75/77/79.  In March 1948 BR allocated them the numbers 58059–58072 to make room for LMS Ivatt Class 2 2-6-2T locomotives, but only eleven actually received their new numbers.

They were built with typical Midland-pattern Johnson boilers with the flared safety valve housing. Some were later rebuilt with LMS pattern boilers with a Belpaire firebox and smaller pop valves. Some had condensing gear fitted for working the 'Widened Lines' tunnels of the Metropolitan Railway.

Withdrawal

They were all withdrawn between 1928 and 1959.  None has been preserved.

References

1833 Class
0-4-4T locomotives
Standard gauge steam locomotives of Great Britain
Railway locomotives introduced in 1892
Dübs locomotives
Neilson locomotives